Robinson v Kilvert (1889) LR 41 ChD 88 is an English tort law case concerning nuisance. It deals with what is sometimes called the issue of a "sensitive claimant".

Facts
A landlord’s cellar maintained an 80 °F (27 °C) temperature for its business, and the heat affected a tenant's paper warehouse business on a floor above.

Judgment
The court held that the tenant had no remedy because the landlord was a reasonable user of his property.

See also
English tort law
Sturges v Bridgman

English tort case law
English nuisance cases
Lord Lindley cases
Court of Appeal (England and Wales) cases
1889 in British law
1889 in case law